Southend United Football Club, an English association football club based in Southend, Essex, was founded in 1906. The club's first team won the Southern League Second Division championship in their first season. Southend had to apply for election alongside the two bottom First Division teams who were applying for re-election, and were unsuccessful. Southend won the title again the following year, and this time, with more places available after two clubs had joined the Football League, they were elected. By 1910–11, the Southern League had adopted automatic promotion and relegation, and Southend were relegated. They returned to the top tier as runners-up in 1912–13, and remained at that level until 1920, when the Football League added a Third Division made up almost entirely of the Southern League First Division teams. That same season, Southend reached the third round (last 16) of the FA Cup; they have progressed to the last 16 four times since, but have gone no further.

Southend remained in the Third Division for the next 39 seasons. The closest they came to a change were via two successful application for re-election, in 1921–22, their second season as a Football League club, and then in 1934–35, and two third-place finishes, in 1931–32 and 1949–50, at a time when only the divisional champions were promoted. In 1965–66, they were relegated to the Fourth Division, and spent the next 25 years oscillating between the two. Southend's first trophy in the Football League came in 1980–81, courtesy of a strong defence and a particularly strong home record, as they won the Fourth Division title by a two-point margin. Eight years later, they were again promoted from the fourth tier, this time in third place, and the following season, a final-day defeat deprived Southend of the title but they were still sure of the runners-up spot that gained promotion to the second tier for the first time in the club's history. Southend spent six seasons at the higher level, during which time they lost a penalty shoot-out to Notts County in the semi-final of the 1993–94 Anglo-Italian Cup, before two consecutive relegations took them back whence they came.

In 2006–07, again after consecutive promotions, they played one more season in the Championshipthe Football League's divisions had been rebranded two years earlierand produced their best League Cup performance, eliminating Manchester United in the fourth round before losing to Tottenham Hotspur in the quarter-final via an arguably offside goal scored five minutes from the end of extra time. Southend reached the final of the Football League Trophy, a cup competition open to teams in the lower divisions of the Football League, in both 2004 and 2005. Both finals were played at the Millennium Stadium while the new Wembley Stadium was under construction, and both ended in defeat by two goals to nil, to Blackpool in 2004 and Wrexham the following year. They repeated the procedure in 2013, albeit this time at the new Wembley, losing 2–0 to Crewe Alexandra and equalling Brentford's record of three final appearances without winning. Financial issues mounted in the 2019–20 season: against a background of non-payment of wages, unpaid taxes, winding-up orders and a transfer embargo meant Southend were unable to avoid relegation to League Two, and even when the tax bill was paid after the sale of the stadium for housing, a 23rd-place finish in 2020–21 meant that Southend United dropped out of the League after 101 years' continuous membership.

As of the end of the 2020–21 season, the team have spent 26 seasons in the fourth tier of the English football league system, 61 in the third, and 7 in the second. The table details the team's achievements and the top goalscorer in senior first-team competitions from their debut season in the Southern League in 1906–07 to the end of the most recently completed season.

Key

Key to league record:
P – Played
W – Games won
D – Games drawn
L – Games lost
F – Goals for
A – Goals against
Pts – Points
Pos – Final position
Key to colours and symbols:

Key to divisions:
South 1 – Southern Football League First Division
South 2 – Southern Football League Second Division
Div 1 – Football League First Division
Div 2 – Football League Second Division
Div 3 – Football League Third Division
Div 4 – Football League Fourth Division
Champ – Football League Championship
League 1 – Football League One, EFL League One
League 2 – Football League Two, EFL League Two
National – National League

Key to stages of competitions:
Group – Group stage
Prelim – Preliminary round
QR1 – First qualifying round
QR2 – Second qualifying round, etc.
R1 – First round
R2 – Second round, etc.
QF – Quarter-final
SF – Semi-final
F – Runners-up
W – Winners
(S) – Southern section of regionalised stage

Details of the abandoned 1939–40 season are shown in italics and appropriately footnoted.

Seasons

Notes

References

External links
Southend United F.C. official website

Seasons
 
Southend United